The Paula cabinet was the 18th cabinet of the Netherlands Antilles.

Composition
The cabinet was composed as follows:

|Minister of General Affairs 
|Alejandro Felippe Paula
|
|28 December 1993
|-
|Minister of Labor, Social Affairs and Public Health
|George Hueck
|SI
|28 December 1993
|-
|Minister of Justice
|Suzanne Römer
|PNP
|28 December 1993
|-
|Minister of Education, Culture and Development Cooperation
|Rudi M. Thomas
||UPB
|28 December 1993
|-
|Minister of Traffic and Communications
|Leo A.I. Chance
|
|28 December 1993
|-
|Minister of Finance
|Faroe Metry
|PNP
|28 December 1993
|}

 Leo A.I. Chance was nominated by the three windward island parties supporting the Paula cabinet.

References

Cabinets of the Netherlands Antilles
1993 establishments in the Netherlands Antilles
Cabinets established in 1993
Cabinets disestablished in 1994
1994 disestablishments in the Netherlands Antilles